Milton Muke (born 10 June 1951) is a Zambian former footballer. He competed in the men's tournament at the 1980 Summer Olympics.

References

External links
 
 

1951 births
Living people
Zambian footballers
Zambia international footballers
Olympic footballers of Zambia
Footballers at the 1980 Summer Olympics
Place of birth missing (living people)
Association football defenders
Green Buffaloes F.C. players